The 49th Tour of Flanders cycling classic was held on Saturday, 17 April 1965. The race was won by Dutch rider Jo de Roo in a two-man sprint with Edward Sels. 51 of 119 riders finished.

Route
The race started in Ghent and finished in Gentbrugge – covering 240 km. There were six categorized climbs:

Results

References

External links
 Video of the 1965 Tour of Flanders on Sporza (in Dutch)

Tour of Flanders
1965 in road cycling
1965 in Belgian sport
1965 Super Prestige Pernod